K-65 may refer to:

K-65 residues
K-65 (Kansas highway), a highway in Kansas
K-65 (1927–1933 Kansas highway), a former highway in Kansas
K-65 trailer